Majalengka Regency is the landlocked regencies (kabupaten) in West Java, Indonesia. It covers an area of 1,204.24 sq. km, and had a population of 1,166,473 at the 2010 Census and 1,305,476 at the 2020 Census; the official estimate as at mid 2021 was 1,318,965. The administrative capital is the town of Majalengka.

Administrative districts
The Majalengka Regency consists of twenty-six districts (kecamatan), subdivided into 13 urban villages (kelurahan) and 318 rural villages (desa). These districts are as follows, listed below with their areas and their populations at the 2010 Census and the 2020 Census; together with the official estimates as at mid 2021. The table also includes the location of the district administrative centres.

The incumbent regency officer (Bupati) of this regency is Hj. Tutty Hayati Anwar SH. MSi.

Transportation

Toll Road Access

Kertajati International Airport
The new airport to serve Bandung as well as West Java. The construction was started in 2015, and inaugurated in 2018 after completion of first phase.

Tourism

Mount Panten
In March 2012, 2 foreign national champion paragliders have surveyed Mount Panten. Landing area, wind velocity and mainly take off area are suitable for paragliding world championship. The take off area is very vast, possible to make take off for several paragliders in the same time and cannot be found in other countries.

References

External links 

 Official Website